Niels Fredriksen Dyhren (16 February 1778  – 25 August 1866) was a Norwegian farmer and non-commissioner military officer. He served as a representative at the Norwegian Constitutional Assembly in 1814.

Niels Fredriksen Dyhren was born on the Dyhren farm in Østre Toten in Oppland, Norway.  In 1800, he became a soldier with Jegerkorpset-Akershus Regiment and 1801 Corporal in the regimental artillery company. In 1814, he was a member of the Norske Jæger Corps and was a Corporal in Valderske skarpskytterbataillon. His time in service included the period of the Napoleonic Wars (1807-1809 and 1814).

He represented Norske Jæger Corps at the Norwegian Constituent Assembly in 1814 together with  Palle Fleischer. At Eidsvoll, he supported the position of the independence party (Selvstendighetspartiet) .

References

External links
Representantene på Eidsvoll 1814 (Cappelen Damm AS)
 Men of Eidsvoll (eidsvollsmenn)

Related Reading
Holme Jørn (2014) De kom fra alle kanter - Eidsvollsmennene og deres hus  (Oslo: Cappelen Damm) 

1778 births
1866 deaths
People from Østre Toten
Norwegian Army personnel
Norwegian military personnel of the Napoleonic Wars
Fathers of the Constitution of Norway